Autry Lamont Denson (born December 8, 1976) is an American football coach and former player who is the running backs coach for the Arizona Cardinals of the National Football League (NFL).  He previously served as the head coach at Charleston Southern University from 2019 to 2022. 

Denson played college football as running back at the University of Notre Dame.  He played professionally for four seasons in the National Football League (NFL) with the Miami Dolphins, the Indianapolis Colts, and the Chicago Bears and one season in the Canadian Football League (CFL) with the Montreal Alouettes.

Playing career

High school
Denson attended Nova High School where he played for Willie Dodaro.

College
Denson is Notre Dame's all-time leading rusher with 4,318 yards and 43 touchdowns while holding many other rushing records at the University of Notre Dame.

In 1997, he ran for 1,268 yards on 264 carries and scored 12 TDs. In 1998, he ran for 1,306 yards on 277 carries and scored 18 TDs.

Denson was the MVP of the Gator Bowl in 1999 played against Georgia Tech.

Professional
Denson was selected in the seventh round with the 233rd pick of the 1999 NFL Draft by Tampa Bay Buccaneers. He never made it to the active roster for Tampa Bay.

In two years (1999–2000) with Miami Dolphins, he ran for 206 yards on 59 carries while also catching 18 passes for 133 yards. In 2000, he returned 20 kicks for 495 yards. Denson spent the 2001 season with the Chicago Bears. He had only one carry for 4 yards while spending most of the year on special teams. While on special teams he returned 23 kicks for 534 yards as well as 1 punt return for 5 yards. During the 2002 with the Indianapolis Colts, Denson rushed for 2 yards on 2 carries with 2 kick returns for 38 yards.

Denson spent the 2004 season in the Canadian Football League (CL) as a member of the Montreal Alouettes. He finished eighth in rushing with 772 yards and nine touchdowns while being given the player of the week Honors during the season.

Coaching career

Early career
In April 2010, after spending some years away from the game of football, Denson was named the head football coach at Pope John Paul II High School in Boca Raton, Florida.

Bethune–Cookman
In 2011, Denson was hired as the running backs coach at Bethune–Cookman University.

Miami (OH)
In 2014, Denson joined Miami University as their running backs coach.

Notre Dame
In 2015, Denson was hired to fill the running backs coaching vacancy at the University of Notre Dame, his alma mater.
 , and the University of South Florida.

Charleston Southern
Denson was named the head coach at Charleston Southern on January 14, 2019. He was relieved of his duties following the 2022 season, after a 2–8 finish.

Head coaching record

References

External links
 Charleston Southern profile
 

1976 births
Living people
American football running backs
African-American players of Canadian football
Arizona Cardinals coaches
Bethune–Cookman Wildcats football coaches
Canadian football running backs
Charleston Southern Buccaneers football coaches
Chicago Bears players
Coaches of American football from Florida
High school football coaches in Florida
Indianapolis Colts players
Montreal Alouettes players
Miami Dolphins players
Miami RedHawks football coaches
Notre Dame Fighting Irish football coaches
Notre Dame Fighting Irish football players
South Florida Bulls football coaches
Nova High School alumni
People from Davie, Florida
People from Lauderhill, Florida
Players of American football from Florida
African-American coaches of American football
African-American players of American football
20th-century African-American sportspeople
21st-century African-American sportspeople
Sportspeople from Broward County, Florida